Tim Stützle (surname alternately spelled Stuetzle; born 15 January 2002) is a German professional ice hockey centre for the Ottawa Senators of the National Hockey League (NHL). Rated one of the top prospects available for the 2020 NHL Entry Draft, he was selected third overall by the Ottawa Senators.

Playing career
Stützle played junior hockey for the Krefelder EV 1981. He was the top scorer on his team for the 2015–16 season. In the 2017–18 season, Stützle transferred to Jungadler Mannheim, scoring 18 goals and 29 assists.

Despite originally committing to play hockey at the University of New Hampshire, and being selected by the Seattle Thunderbirds in the 2019 CHL Import Draft, Stützle opted to remain in Germany, and signed a three-year contract with Adler Mannheim in June 2019. He made his professional debut at the age of 17 in the Champions Hockey League opening round on 30 August 2019 against the Vienna Capitals.

On 6 October 2020, Stützle was selected third overall in the 2020 NHL Entry Draft by the Ottawa Senators. The selection was made using a pick which they had previously acquired in a 2018 trade with the San Jose Sharks that sent defenceman Erik Karlsson to San Jose. The pick was announced by the Jeopardy! host and former Ottawa resident Alex Trebek, who revealed the selection with a mock Jeopardy! question and answer done in the style of the show. On 13 October, while continuing to train in Germany with Mannheim in preparation for the upcoming 2020–21 season, Stützle suffered a broken hand, requiring surgery with a 6–8 week recovery period.

On 27 December 2020, Stützle signed a three-year, entry-level contract with the Ottawa Senators. He scored his first National Hockey League (NHL) goal on 16 January 2021 against Jack Campbell in a 3–2 loss to the Toronto Maple Leafs. On 2 March, he was announced as the NHL's Rookie of the Month for February of that year, after accumulating 10 points in 14 games. On 8 May, Stützle scored his first NHL hat-trick, in a 4–2 win over the Winnipeg Jets.

Stützle switched from winger to centre during his second NHL season. He had previously played the position before being drafted and his game significantly improved after the move. Stützle fought Edmonton Oilers defenceman William Lagesson in his first NHL fight on 31 January 2022; and later scored the game's game-winning goal in overtime.

On 7 September 2022, Stützle signed an eight-year, $66.8 million contract extension with the Senators, which was the largest contract in Senators' franchise history, surpassing Thomas Chabot's $64 million contract signed in 2019.

International play
Stützle was selected as the best player on Team Germany at the end of the first qualifying match against Kazakhstan in the 2020 World Junior Championships. He had five assists during the tournament, and averaged 18 minutes ice time in five games, and was an A-rated skater. In the 2021 World Junior Ice Hockey Championships, Stützle was named team captain for Germany and led them to the playoff round for the first time in World Juniors history. He tallied five goals and five assists in five games and was named player of the game for the team's second game against Canada. After the tournament ended, Stützle was named best forward by the directorate and one of the members of the media all-star team.

Career statistics

Regular season and playoffs

International

References

External links
 

2002 births
Living people
Adler Mannheim players
German ice hockey forwards
National Hockey League first-round draft picks
Ottawa Senators draft picks
Ottawa Senators players
People from Viersen
Sportspeople from Düsseldorf (region)
German expatriate ice hockey people
Expatriate ice hockey players in Canada
German expatriate sportspeople in Canada